USS Jamestown may refer to any one of a number of United States Navy vessels.

 , was a sloop that served from 1844 until 1892
 , was a patrol gunboat that served from 1941 until 1946
 , was originally a Liberty ship (AG-166) completed in 1945, converted and renamed in 1963, and then redesignated in 1964 to AGTR-3.  Scrapped in 1970.

United States Navy ship names